Pollo a la brasa, pollo asado, blackened chicken, or charcoal chicken, is a variety of rotisserie chicken especially associated with the cuisine of Peru. 

It was developed in Peru in the 1950s by Swiss immigrants to Peru. 

Originally its consumption was specific to high-end restaurants (during the 1950s until the 1970s), but today it is a widely available dish. The original version consisted of a chicken (cooked on a spit over charcoal and seasoned only with salt) served with large french fries and traditionally eaten with the fingers, though today additional spices are used to prepare it, and people may eat it with cutlery if they choose.  It is almost always served with creamy (mayonnaise-based) sauces, and most frequently with a salsa known as ají.  

In 2013, Peruvian cuisine was listed among the top three cuisines with potential for popular menu items in the United States. Pollo a la brasa can now be found in eateries all throughout the world and is considered to be a staple item on the menu of Peruvian fusion restaurants.  It is considered a national dish of Peru; with Peruvians consuming it an average of three times per month and with rotisserie chicken restaurants accounting for 40% of the fast food industry in the country.

History 

The dish was developed by Roger Schuler, a Swiss resident of Chaclacayo, Lima, in 1950.  Schuler was a Swiss national who found it difficult to return to his home country during World War II, and after migrating around several locations in Chile and Peru, settled in Lima, working in hotels and restaurants.  He devised the specific method of cooking the chicken, observing his cook's technique in preparation, and gradually, along with his business partners, perfected the recipe, creating the Granja Azul restaurant in Santa Clara, district of Ate, in Lima.  After developing the initial recipe, he received a large catering order, and seeking to cook a larger volume of food in a shorter time, sought out a fellow Swiss immigrant, Franz Ulrich, a metalworker who developed a type of rotisserie oven to allow high throughput of chicken he named "El rotombo".  While the initial preparation only included salt as a seasoning, today preparations typically include rosemary, huacatay, black pepper, soy sauce, ají panca, and cumin.  The Schuler family still owns the Granja Azul, and a number of other restaurants around Peru, and Ulrich continued to produce rotisserie ovens.

See also
 Peruvian cuisine
 List of chicken dishes
 List of spit-roasted foods

References

Peruvian cuisine
Peruvian chicken dishes
Spit-cooked foods
Cultural heritage of Peru